The Egg Harbor Township Schools is a comprehensive community public school district that serves students in pre-kindergarten through twelfth grade from Egg Harbor Township in Atlantic County, New Jersey, United States.

As of the 2018–19 school year, the district, comprising seven schools, had an enrollment of 7,432 students and 604.8 classroom teachers (on an FTE basis), for a student–teacher ratio of 12.3:1.

The district is classified by the New Jersey Department of Education as being in District Factor Group "CD", the sixth-highest of eight groupings. District Factor Groups organize districts statewide to allow comparison by common socioeconomic characteristics of the local districts. From lowest socioeconomic status to highest, the categories are A, B, CD, DE, FG, GH, I and J.

History
In 2010-2011 it had 7,864 students, its peak enrollment. Enrollment decreased afterward due to a decline in casino jobs. Between 2010-2011 and 2014 its enrollment declined by 3%. In 2010 alone the proposed budget called for 70 jobs to be cut.

Schools
Schools in the district (with 2018–19 enrollment data from the National Center for Education Statistics) are:
Elementary schools
Clayton J. Davenport Elementary School Complex with 753 students in grades K-3
Latiya White, Principal
E. H. Slaybaugh Elementary School Complex with 851 students in grades PreK-3
Joseph Marinelli, Principal
H. Russell Swift Elementary School with 438 students in grades K-3
Joetta Surace, Principal
Dr. Joyanne D. Miller Elementary School with 1,110 students in grade 4-5
James Battersby, Principal
Middle schools
Alder Avenue Middle School with 877 students in grade 6-8
Maryann Giardina, Principal
Fernwood Avenue Middle School with 970 students in grade 6-8
Kevin Fricke, Principal
High school
Egg Harbor Township High School with 2,357 students in grade 9-12
Patricia Connor, Principal

The community in the 1880s established a school for black children in 1884. Some African-Americans had objected to a separate school and wanted to send their children to the school for white children. A report for the 1884-1885 school year stated that opposition to the school subsided.

Administration
Core members of the district's administration are:
Dr. Kimberly Gruccio, Superintendent
Chandra Anaya, Business Administrator / Board Secretary

Board of education
The district's board of education, with nine members, sets policy and oversees the fiscal and educational operation of the district through its administration. As a Type II school district, the board's trustees are elected directly by voters to serve three-year terms of office on a staggered basis, with three seats up for election each year held (since 2012) as part of the November general election. The board appoints a superintendent to oversee the day-to-day operation of the district.

Student body
In 2016 it had over 7,500 students, giving it one of the largest enrollments among school districts in Atlantic County.

References

External links
Egg Harbor Township Schools
 
School Data for the Egg Harbor Township Schools, National Center for Education Statistics

Egg Harbor Township, New Jersey
New Jersey District Factor Group CD
School districts in Atlantic County, New Jersey